Pterocypha defensata is a species of geometrid moth in the family Geometridae. It is found in the Caribbean Sea and North America.

The MONA or Hodges number for Pterocypha defensata is 7299.

References

Further reading

 
 
 

Hydriomenini
Articles created by Qbugbot
Moths described in 1862